Theriodesmus is an extinct genus of Therocephalian  found in South Africa.

References 

Therocephalia genera
Triassic synapsids of Africa